Epichloë hordelymi is a hybrid asexual species in the fungal genus Epichloë. 

A systemic and seed-transmissible grass symbiont first described in 2013,  Epichloë hordelymi is a natural allopolyploid of Epichloë bromicola and a strain in the Epichloë typhina complex.

Epichloë hordelymi is found in Europe, where it has been identified in the grass species Hordelymus europaeus.

References 

hordelymi
Fungi described in 2013
Fungi of Europe